Year 1460 (MCDLX) was a leap year starting on Tuesday (link will display the full calendar) of the Julian calendar, the 1460th year of the Common Era (CE) and Anno Domini (AD) designations, the 460th year of the 2nd millennium, the 60th year of the 15th century, and the 1st year of the 1460s decade.

Events 
 January–December 
 January 15 – Battle of Sandwich: Yorkists raid Sandwich, Kent, England, and capture the royal fleet.
 March 5 – King Christian I of Denmark issues the Treaty of Ribe, enabling himself to become Count of Holstein, and regain control of Denmark's lost Duchy of Schleswig.
 April 4 – The University of Basel is founded in Switzerland.
 June 26 – Wars of the Roses: Richard Neville, Earl of Warwick and Edward, Earl of March (eldest son of Richard Plantagenet, Duke of York) land in England with an army, and march on London.
 July 4 – The cannons of the Tower of London, still in Lancastrian hands, are fired on the city of London, which is mostly in Yorkist hands. The Tower is surrendered on July 19.
 July 10 – Wars of the Roses – Battle of Northampton: Warwick and March defeat a Lancastrian army and seize King Henry VI of England. It is agreed that York will be Henry's heir, disinheriting the King's son Edward of Westminster, Prince of Wales.
 August 3 – While supervising a siege of English occupiers of Roxburgh Castle, King James II of Scotland is killed, when one of his own cannons explodes.
 December 30 – Wars of the Roses – Battle of Wakefield: A Lancastrian army under Henry Beaufort, Duke of Somerset and Henry Percy, Earl of Northumberland decisively defeats a Yorkist army under Richard of York and his son, Edmund, Earl of Rutland, who are both killed. York's son Edward becomes leader of the Yorkist faction.

 Date unknown 
 Ali Bey Mihaloğlu captures Michael Szilágyi.
 Portuguese navigator Pedro de Sintra reaches the coast of modern-day Sierra Leone.
 A famine breaks out in the Deccan Plateau of India.
 A monk, Leonardo da Pistoia, arrives in Florence from Macedonia, with the Corpus Hermeticum.

Births 
 May 8 – Frederick I, Margrave of Brandenburg-Ansbach (d. 1536)
 June 1 – Enno I, Count of East Frisia (1466–1491) (d. 1491)
 September 29 – Louis II de la Trémoille, French military leader (d. 1525)
 date unknown
 Vasco da Gama, Portuguese explorer (d. 1524)
 Isabella Hoppringle, Scottish abbess and spy (d. 1538)
 Svante Nilsson, regent of Sweden (d. 1512)
 Ana de Mendonça, Spanish courtier (d. 1542)
 Edward Sutton, 2nd Baron Dudley, English nobleman (d. 1532)
 probable
 Antoine Brumel, Flemish composer (d. 1515)
 Tristão da Cunha, Portuguese explorer (d. 1540)
 Katarzyna Weiglowa, Jewish martyr (d. 1539)
 Gwerful Mechain, Welsh erotic poet (d. 1502)
 Konstanty Ostrogski, Grand Hetman of Lithuania (d. 1530)
 Tilman Riemenschneider, German sculptor (d. 1531)
 Arnolt Schlick, German organist and composer (d. after 1521)
 Charles Somerset, 1st Earl of Worcester, English nobleman (d. 1526)
 Rodrigo de Bastidas, Spanish conquistador (d. 1527)
 Ponce de Leon, Spanish conquistador

Deaths 
 February 29 – Albert III, Duke of Bavaria-Munich (b. 1401)
 July 10 
 Humphrey Stafford, 1st Duke of Buckingham, English military leader (b. 1402)
 John Talbot, 2nd Earl of Shrewsbury (b. c. 1413)
 Thomas Percy, 1st Baron Egremont, English baron (b. 1422)
 July 19 – Lord Scales, English commander (b. 1397)
 August 3 – King James II of Scotland (b. 1430)
 September 20 – Gilles Binchois, Flemish composer (b. c. 1400)
 September 25 – Katharina of Hanau, German countess regent (b. 1408)
 November 13 – Prince Henry the Navigator, Portuguese patron of exploration (b. 1394)
 December 14 – Guarino da Verona, Italian humanist (b. 1370)
 December 30 
 Edmund, Earl of Rutland, brother of Kings Edward IV of England and Richard III of England (b. 1443)
 Richard of York, 3rd Duke of York, claimant to the English throne (in battle) (b. 1411)
 December 31 – Richard Neville, 5th Earl of Salisbury, English politician (executed) (b. 1400)
 date unknown
 Francesco II Acciaioli, last Duke of Athens (murdered by consent)
 Israel Isserlein, Austrian Jewish scholar (b. 1390)
 Reginald Pecock, deposed Welsh bishop and writer (b. c. 1392)

References